This page lists the traffic signs used in Belgium, as included in the traffic code.

Warning signs

Priority signs

Prohibitory signs

Mandatory signs

Parking signs

Indicatory signs

Additional signs

Icons

References

Belgium
Belgium transport-related lists
Road transport in Belgium